Telephones - main lines in use:
3,000 (1995)

Telephones - mobile cellular:
available, working more accurately than landlines

Telephone system:
domestic:
minimal system
international:
satellite earth station - 1 Intelsat (Atlantic Ocean)

Radio broadcast stations:
AM 2, FM 4, shortwave 0 (1998)

Radios:
38,000 (1997)

Television broadcast stations:
2 (1997)

Televisions:
23,000 (1997)

Internet Service Providers (ISPs):
available, dial-up low quality, "broad band" (128/256) very expensive

Country code (Top level domain): .st

See also
Media of São Tomé and Príncipe

References 
CIA World Fact Book - São Tomé and Príncipe